This is a list of public art in Knightsbridge, a district in the City of Westminster and the Royal Borough of Kensington and Chelsea in London.

City of Westminster

Royal Borough of Kensington and Chelsea

References

Bibliography

 

Knightsbridge
Public art